The Guilden Morden boar is a sixth- or seventh-century Anglo-Saxon copper alloy figure of a boar that may have once served as the crest of a helmet. It was found around 1864 or 1865 in a grave in Guilden Morden, a village in the eastern English county of Cambridgeshire. There the boar attended a skeleton with other objects, including a small earthenware bead with an incised pattern, although the boar is all that now remains. Herbert George Fordham, whose father originally discovered the boar, donated it to the British Museum in 1904; as of 2018 it was on view in 

The boar is simply designed, distinguished primarily by a prominent mane; eyes, eyebrows, nostrils and tusks are only faintly present. A pin and socket design formed by the front and hind legs suggests that the boar was mounted on another object, such as a helmet. Such is the case on one of the contemporary Torslunda plates found in Sweden, where boar-crested helmets are depicted similarly.

Boar-crested helmets are a staple of Anglo-Saxon imagery, evidence of a Germanic tradition in which the boar invoked the protection of deities. The Guilden Morden boar is one of three—together with the helmets from Benty Grange and Wollaston—known to have survived to the present, and it has been exhibited both domestically and internationally. The Guilden Morden boar recalls a time when such decoration may have been common; in the Anglo-Saxon poem Beowulf, where boar-adorned helmets are mentioned five times, Hrothgar speaks of when "our boar-crests had to take a battering in the line of action."

Description
The Guilden Morden boar is simply designed and well preserved. An eye, eyebrows and nostrils leave slight traces and were possibly punched after the boar was cast, while a tusk is indicated on the boar's right side. The tail once formed a full circle but was broken around 1904.

The resultant pin and socket design would allow the boar to be mounted on another object, particularly a helmet.

Discovery

It was found by Herbert Fordham, co-managing partner at a successful family brewery, while digging for coprolites, a particularly rich phosphate then used as fertiliser and the pursuit of which effectively provided the only employment other than agriculture in Cambridgeshire. Writing about the boar in 1904, his son Herbert George Fordham suggested that:

A drawing made between April 1882 and September 1883, held by the British Museum, shows the boar alongside a bronze ring and two glass beads, one amber-coloured, the other red with white inlay. Underneath the images it is noted that the items were "all found in a grave with a doubled-up skeleton". Fordham had had no further information about the discovery of the boar, its location or the associated (and now lost) objects, and donated the boar to the British Museum in 1904.

The boar is displayed in Room 41 of the British Museum. The gallery covers Europe from 300 to 1100 AD, and includes objects such as the finds from the Sutton Hoo ship-burial and the Lycurgus Cup. In addition to its place at the British Museum, the Guilden Morden boar has been shown in both domestic and international exhibitions. From 1 April to 30 October 2004, the boar was displayed at the Sutton Hoo Visitor Centre in Suffolk as part of Between Myth and Reality. It was again exhibited from 26 July to 16 October 2013, this time at the Diözesanmuseum Paderborn (de) in Paderborn, Germany, as part of CREDO: Christianisierung Europas im Mittelalter (Christianisation of Medieval Europe).

Typology

The Guilden Morden boar is of Anglo-Saxon origin, so marked by the additional items found in the grave, and by comparable helmets discovered elsewhere in England, although until 1977 it was misidentified as Celtic. It was likely once mounted atop a boar-crested helmet, a number of which have been either found in archaeological excavations or seen in artistic depictions. Two other boar-crested helmets are known—from Benty Grange and from Wollaston—and the Guilden Morden boar is a close parallel of the boar fixed to the former. The Benty Grange boar has a similar shape; it has a long and distinctive elongated snout projecting forward, a similar stance, and front and hind legs each joined as one. It dates to approximately 650 to 700 AD and the Wollaston helmet to the time around 675 AD, although a date more specific than the sixth or seventh century AD has not been suggested for the Guilden Morden boar.

Understood in its broader context, the boar would likely have adorned an early model of the "crested helmets" known in Northern Europe in the sixth through eleventh centuries AD. Though the remains of fifty such helmets are known, most are from Scandinavia and only five from the Anglo-Saxon period are preserved enough that their original form can be determined. These, the helmets from Benty Grange, Sutton Hoo, Coppergate, Wollaston and Staffordshire, may have shared similarities with the helmet to which the Guilden Morden boar was attached. Scandinavian helmets are also depicted artistically with boar crests, such as on one of the four Torslunda plates found in Sweden. The boars atop the helmets worn by the two warriors on the plate are highly similar to the one from Guilden Morden, and similarly appear to be fastened to their helmets with a pin and socket device.

Notes

References

Bibliography

  
 
Old English quotations above use the Klaeber text, published as  
  
 
 
 
  
 
  
 Image on page 404
 
  
 Images on plate XIV

External links
 Seven photographs on the British Museum website
 Scanned pages of the Beowulf manuscript in the Nowell Codex held by the British Library

6th century in England
6th-century works
7th century in England
7th-century works
1864 archaeological discoveries
1864 in England
1865 archaeological discoveries
1865 in England
Anglo-Saxon archaeology
History of Cambridgeshire
Medieval helmets
Medieval European objects in the British Museum
Pigs in art
Wild boars